The Samoa national rugby union team (also known as Manu Samoa) represents Samoa in men's international rugby union and it is governed by the Samoa Rugby Union. They are also known as Manu Samoa, which is thought to derive from the name of a Samoan warrior.  They perform a traditional Samoan challenge called the siva tau before each game. Samoa Rugby Union were formerly members of the Pacific Islands Rugby Alliance (PIRA) along with Fiji and Tonga. They are ranked 11th in the world.

Rugby was introduced to Samoa in the early 1920s and a governing body was soon formed. The first international was played as Western Samoa against Fiji in August 1924. Along with Tonga, these nations would meet regularly and eventually contest competitions such as the Pacific Tri-Nations – with Western Samoa winning the first of these. From 1924 to 1997 Samoa was known as Western Samoa.

Samoa have been to every Rugby World Cup since the 1991 tournament. That tournament, along with the 1995 competition, saw them make the quarter-finals. Under their new coach, former New Zealand and Samoan international player Michael Jones, Samoa competed in the 2007 Rugby World Cup. However, Samoa had a dismal World Cup campaign, winning only one match and finishing fourth in their group. Samoa showed an improved performance at the 2011 Rugby World Cup, winning two matches by comfortable margins, and losing close matches to South Africa and Wales.

History
The Marist Brothers brought the game of rugby to Western Samoa in 1924 and The Western Samoa Rugby Football Union was formed in 1924. On 18 August 1924, Western Samoa played its first international against Fiji in the capital Apia, the visitors winning 6–0. The match was played at 7am to allow the Samoans time to get to work afterwards and was played on a pitch with a large tree on the halfway line. The return match was won 9–3 by Samoa to draw the series.

In 1954 Western Samoa visited both Pacific Island neighbors Fiji and Tonga, but had to wait a further 20 years before a tour of New Zealand took place. The Samoans won one of eight matches on that tour.

The traditional tri-series between Tonga, Fiji and Western Samoa was established in 1982 with Western Samoa winning the first tournament. Wales visited Western Samoa and won the test 32–16 at Apia. The tour led to a return visit to Wales which brought Western Samoa out of International limbo, although Western Samoa were not invited to the first Rugby World Cup in 1987.

The following year a 14-match tour of Europe took place before a World Cup elimination series in Tokyo, which gave Western Samoa a place in the 1991 Rugby World Cup in Britain. They made a huge impact. After sweeping aside Wales 16–13 in Cardiff and defeating Argentina 35–12, and narrowly losing 3–9 to eventual champions Australia in their pool match, Western Samoa, a country with a population of 160,000, found itself in the quarterfinals against Scotland at Murrayfield. The Scots won comfortably 28–6, but the Samoans were clearly the personality team of the tournament.  One Welsh fan ruefully remarked after Wales's defeat, "It's a good job we weren't playing all of Samoa."

Over the next two years the side had a number of notable wins. The most outstanding achievement were in Sevens where it won the 1993 Hong Kong and 1992 Middlesex Sevens. The 1995 Rugby World Cup in South Africa proved that the team belonged in top company. They again reached the quarterfinals after wins over Argentina and Italy, but were beaten 42–14 by the eventual winners South Africa. After the Cup, Manu Samoa made a 13-match tour of England and Scotland, drawing 15–15 with the Scots and going down 27–9 to England.

With the advent of professional rugby in 1995 it was vital for Manu Samoa to develop a new administrative structure. This was made possible with Fay Richwhite and the Western Samoan Rugby Union joining forces to form Manu Samoa Rugby Limited. Fay Richwhite invested $5 million from 1995 to 2004 into Samoan rugby.

Samoa emerged from the 1999 World Cup with its honor intact after another shock 38–31 victory over host nation Wales in the pool stages. They again lost out to Scotland in the quarter final play-off.

Manu Samoa qualified for the 2003 World Cup with a 17–16 loss against Fiji, Earl Va'a missing an injury-time penalty. They recovered to beat Tonga both home and away and avenged that Fijian defeat with a 22–12 win in Nadi. They ultimately had to settle for second place in the round robin, behind Fiji on points difference, and a place in the tougher of the two Rugby World Cup 2003 pools alongside automatic qualifiers England and South Africa. In one of the games of the tournament, they led eventual champions England for most of the game before losing 35–22.

Samoa qualified for the 2011 World Cup after beating Papua New Guinea 73–12 in Port Moresby on 18 July 2009. They won 188–19 on aggregate over two matches against Papua New Guinea, having won 115–7 at Apia Park the previous week.

Samoa began their 2011 World Cup campaign preparation with a flying start, after registering an upset against No.2 ranked Australia with a four-try-to-two win of 32–23.

Financial problems

In November 2017, Samoa's prime minister and SRU chairman Tuilaepa Lupesoliai Sailele Malielegaoi announced that the organisation was bankrupt, although those claims were denied by world governing body World Rugby.

World Cup record

In one of the scenes of the feature film, Invictus, Western Samoa can be seen playing South Africa in the 1995 Rugby World Cup.

Wins against Tier 1 nations

In addition, Samoa drew with Scotland 15-15 on the 18 November 1995 at Murrayfield Stadium, Edinburgh, Scotland.

Overall record

Below is table of the representative rugby matches played by a Samoa national XV at test level up until 26 October 2021.

Players

Current squad
On 5 October 2022, the following 31 players were called up for the Northern Hemisphere Tour 2022.

Head Coach:  Seilala Mapusua
 Caps Updated: 5 November 2021

Player records

Most caps

Last updated: Romania vs Samoa, 19 November 2022. Statistics include officially capped matches only.

Most tries

Last updated: Romania vs Samoa, 19 November 2022. Statistics include officially capped matches only.

Most points

Last updated: Romania vs Samoa, 19 November 2022. Statistics include officially capped matches only.

Most matches as captain

Last updated: Romania vs Samoa, 19 November 2022. Statistics include officially capped matches only.

Most points in a match

Last updated: Romania vs Samoa, 19 November 2022. Statistics include officially capped matches only.

Most tries in a match

Last updated: Romania vs Samoa, 19 November 2022. Statistics include officially capped matches only.

Coaches

New Zealand connection

Western Samoa's triumph in the 1991 Rugby World Cup was inspired by their assistant coach Bryan Williams, who was a New Zealand-born (of Samoan descent) All Black great of the 1970s. The 1991 Samoan World Cup team included many New Zealand born or raised players; the catalyst was Auckland prop Peter Fatialofa, who in 1989, became the first major New Zealand-based player to play for Samoa. By the time of the 1991 World Cup several other New Zealand-born Samoans like Pat Lam, Stephen Bachop, Frank Bunce and Apollo Perelini had joined him. New Zealand born players with Samoan parentage have played for Samoa, such as Earl Va'a, Pat Lam and Lome Fa'atau.

The rugby relationship that exists between New Zealand and Samoa is a complex one. Close ties exist between the two countries, these bonds first being formed with the start of mass Polynesian migration to New Zealand in the latter half of the twentieth century. At the 2007 World Cup, there were 14 New Zealand-born players in the Samoan squad. The only team with more foreign born players in their squad was Italy who had 15.

Strips

Manu Samoa play in blue and white uniforms, with the home strip consisting of blue jerseys, white shorts and blue socks and the away kit being with the colours reversed. Since 2007, the flag of Samoa has been featured on the left sleeve and pe'a-like patterns were incorporated into the jerseys. Sponsored logos appear on jerseys for matches other than the Rugby World Cup, where branding, except for equipment manufacturers, is not allowed.

See also

 Rugby World Cup
 Pacific Tri-Nations
 Pacific Islanders rugby union team
 Samoa national rugby sevens team
 Samoa Rugby Football Union
 Samoa national rugby league team

Notes

External links
 Manu Samoa
 Samoa Rugby Union
 Manu Samoa Looking Forward For RWC2011 Manu Samoa Rugby blog
 Samoan rugby union news Planet Rugby
 The information website for supporters of the Manu Samoa Rugby Team
 Rankings International Rugby Board
 Pacific Islanders Rugby Team Supporters Site

 
Oceanian national rugby union teams